Mario Javier Feliciano (born November 20, 1998) is a Puerto Rican professional baseball catcher in the Detroit Tigers organization. He previously played in Major League Baseball (MLB) for the Milwaukee Brewers in 2021.

Career

Milwaukee Brewers
The Milwaukee Brewers selected Feliciano in the second round of the 2016 Major League Baseball draft out of the Carlos Beltran Academy in Florida, Puerto Rico. He made his professional debut with the Arizona League Brewers.

Feliciano spent the 2017 season with the Wisconsin Timber Rattlers, batting .265 with 16 RBIs over 29 games, and 2018 with the Arizona League Brewers and Carolina Mudcats, slashing .251/.320/.331 with four home runs and 36 RBIs in 104 games. He played in only 46 games during the 2018 season, hitting .213 with three home runs, and only two games in the Arizona Fall League due to a shoulder injury. He started 2019 with Carolina.

He did not play in a game in 2020 due to the cancellation of the Minor League Baseball season because of the COVID-19 pandemic. The Brewers added Feliciano to their 40-man roster after the 2020 season. 

On May 1, 2021, Feliciano was promoted to the major leagues for the first time. He made his MLB debut that night as a pinch hitter, drawing a walk against Los Angeles Dodgers pitcher Alex Vesia in the bottom of the 11th inning. Feliciano scored the game-winning run later that inning, his first MLB run scored.

On December 14, 2022, Feliciano was designated for assignment.

Detroit Tigers
On December 21, 2022, Feliciano was claimed off waivers by the Detroit Tigers. On January 6, 2023, Feliciano was removed from the 40-man roster and sent outright to the Triple-A Toledo Mud Hens.

References

External links

1998 births
Living people
Arizona League Brewers players
Atenienses de Manatí (baseball) players
Biloxi Shuckers players
Carolina Mudcats players
Major League Baseball catchers
Major League Baseball players from Puerto Rico
Milwaukee Brewers players
Peoria Javelinas players
Nashville Sounds players
Tiburones de Aguadilla players
Wisconsin Timber Rattlers players